South High School is a public high school in Torrance, California. It is one of five high schools in the Torrance Unified School District.

History

South High School opened in September 1957 and moved to a new campus in January, 1958 with 20 buildings and 106 classrooms. It currently serves children south of Sepulveda, west of Hawthorne and north of Lomita Boulevard.

In 1980 Asahi Gakuen, a weekend Japanese-language education institution, began renting space in South Torrance High School. The school continues to use the school for its Torrance Campus (トーランス校 Tōransu-kō).

Since 2004, South High has been under refurbishment. Renovations include improved handicapped accessibility, improved lighting, and new signage.

American Beauty was filmed on the South High School campus during the winter break of 1998/1999.  Many contemporary South High students were featured as extras in the scenes set on campus.

The short movie Skaterdater was filmed using the Imperial Skateboard Club whose members went to South High.

Demographics
In the 2014–15 school year, South High had an enrollment of 2,132 students.
African-American - 2.4%
American Indian - 0.50%
Asian - 30.4%
Filipino - 3%
Hispanic or Latino - 14.7%
Pacific Islander - 0.60%
Caucasian - 41.70%%
Multi-Racial - 5.10%
Other - 1.6%

The average household income of South High's ZIP code (90505) is $105,771.

Athletics
South High's mascot is the Spartan, and their colors are green and white.

Fall Sports:
 Cheer(F/S, JV, V)
 Boys' Cross Country(F/S, JV, V)
 Girls' Cross Country(F/S, JV, V)
 Football(F/S, V)
 Girls' Golf
 Marching Band
 Boys' Surf(V)
 Girls' Surf
 Girls' Tennis(F/S, JV, V)
 Girls' Volleyball(F/S, JV, V)
 Boys' Water Polo(JV, V)
 Esports (JV, V)
Winter Sports:
 Boys' Basketball(F/S, JV, V)
 Girls' Basketball(F/S, JV, V)
 Boys' Soccer(F/S, JV, V)
 Girls' Soccer(F/S, JV, V)
 Girls' Water Polo(JV, V)
 Wrestling(JV, V)
 Esports (JV, V)
Spring Sports:
 Baseball(F/S, JV, V)
 Boys' Golf
 Softball(JV, V)
 Boys' Swimming(F/S, JV, V)
 Girls' Swimming(F/S, JV, V)
 Boys' Tennis(JV, V)
 Boys' Track(F/S, JV, V)
 Girls' Track(F/S, JV, V)
 Boys' Volleyball(F/S, JV, V)
 Beach Volleyball
 Esports (JV, V)

Activities
The Marching Band won West High Invitationals Sweepstakes 2009, 2010 Percussion State Champs, and the 2011 & 2013 SCJA Division 5A State Champions. The South High 2014-15 Advanced Dance Team were the 2015 USA Dance National Champions in the category "Novelty." In 2017, the 2016-17 Advanced Dance Team became state champions at the USA State Championship, while also placing first in several divisions at USA Regionals. The 2016-17 Athletic Training Program placed first in the small school division at the St. Francis Sports Medical Competition.

CIF Championships
2019 - Boys' Football, Division 14
2015 - Girls' Basketball, Division II
2014 & 2017 - Girls' Soccer, Division IV & Division III
2017 - Girls' Softball, Division V
2014 & 2015 - Girls' Tennis, Division IV
2012 - Boys' Volleyball, Division III
2004 & 2014 - Women's Volleyball, Division II
1962 - Boys' Wrestling, Open Division, First CIF Title

Notable alumni
Mike Andrews: former MLB second baseman, currently Chair of The Jimmy Fund
Rob Andrews: former MLB second baseman
Greg Bargar: former MLB pitcher
Gillian Boxx: 1996 Olympic gold medalist (Softball)
Shannon Boxx: 2004, 2008 Olympic gold medallist (Soccer)
Chuck Codd: former professional soccer player
Juan Croucier: former bassist for Ratt
Michael B. Donley: former US Secretary of the Air Force
Chris Donnels:  former MLB third baseman
Tim Drevno: former offensive line coach for the San Francisco 49ers
Jason Farol: singer on Duets (TV series)
Steven Roger Fischer: prominent academician, writer and preeminent Polynesian historian, ethnographer, and linguist
Ryo Fujii: professional soccer player
Chad Morton: former NFL running back and kick/punt returner
Greg Popovich: Founder & Owner of Castle Rock Winery
Johnnie Morton: former NFL wide receiver, mixed martial artist
Sendhil Mullainathan: professor of economics at The University of Chicago
Aaron North: lead guitarist for Nine Inch Nails
Bob Anderson (wrestler): USA Teams, AAU and College Champion Wrestler
Carroll Bubs Davis: guitarist singer songwriter composer: several famous bands guest appearance with Peter Frampton, Billy Idol, Green Day, etc.
David Patterson: professor of computer science at University of California, Berkeley and winner of the ACM AM Turing Award, the Nobel Prize of Computer Science
Steve Smith: former world record holder in the indoor pole vault
Ken Turner: former MLB pitcher
Chauncey Washington: former NFL running back
John White: CFL running back
Alejandro Daniel Wolff: American diplomat, former US Ambassador to Chile and acting U.S. Permanent Representative to the United Nations
Gary Steele: Intramural Basketball champions 1969; Gold trunks 1967–1970;Co-photographer and double of Blythe movie
Mike Song: Professional dancer for Kinjaz
Kimmy Maxine Shields: Actress; Insatiable 2018 - ; Big Little Lies 2017; Girlboss 2017
Fred Goss: TV director, actor, producer and writer

References

External links

Official South High School website

Public high schools in Los Angeles County, California
Education in Torrance, California
Buildings and structures in Torrance, California
Educational institutions established in 1957
1957 establishments in California